Ian James Love (born 1 March 1958) is a Welsh former professional footballer who played as a forward.  He made 52 appearances in the Football League during spells with Swansea City, Torquay United and Cardiff City.

Career
After playing local league football, Love joined Barry Town in 1979. In two spells with Barry and one with Merthyr Tydfil, he impressed enough to be offered a professional deal by Swansea City in 1986. He scored nine goals in 41 league appearances for the side. He also scored in the first leg of the 1988 Football League Fourth Division play-off Final as Swansea won promotion to the Third Division.

He was sold to Torquay United for £2,000 in March 1989 but left the club soon after. He joined Cardiff City on non-contract terms, making two league appearances before returning to Barry Town.

References

1958 births
Living people
Footballers from Cardiff
Welsh footballers
Barry Town United F.C. players
Merthyr Tydfil F.C. players
Swansea City A.F.C. players
Torquay United F.C. players
Cardiff City F.C. players
English Football League players
Association football forwards